Heavenly Sword and Dragon Slaying Sabre is a 2019 Chinese wuxia television series adapted from the novel The Heaven Sword and Dragon Saber by Jin Yong. Originally published in newspapers from 1961 to 1963, the story has been revised twice; once in 1979 and the second in 2005. This remake is primarily based on the third edition of the novel. The series is the first adaptation to be released as a web series and was first broadcast on Tencent in China on February 27, 2019.

Plot
In the late-Yuan dynasty of China, martial art sects and warriors fight for the lost Dragon Sabre which, according to legend, grants its possessor rulership of the world. Yu Daiyan retrieves the sword but Yin Yewang's sister, Yin Susu, poisons him. Susu arranges to transport the third brother home to be treated but an unknown mercenary cripples him.

Zhang Cuishan watches the Heavenly Eagle Sect demonstrate the dragon sabre but Xie Xun snatches it away and takes Cuishan and Susu to a remote island but their ship sinks. Cuishan and Susu arrive at an island that they like to call Fire Ice Island and fall in love, and married each other there. Xie Xun arrives there the next day and the three of them decide to become a family disregarding their differences due to the birth of Cuishan and Susu's child, Zhang Wuji. The child is named Wuji in memory of Xie Xun's son Xie Wuji and names the Golden-Hair Lion King as her son's godfather.

Ten years later, Cuishan, Susu, and young Wuji leave the island without Xie Xun, who chooses to stay on the island. Cuishan, Susu, and Wuji return to the mainland and travel to Wudang. During the journey, Wuji is kidnapped by one of the Xuan Ming Elders. At Wudang, Daiyan recognizes Susu's voice. Cuishan takes responsibility for the many murders Susu committed in the past and suicides in front of multiple sects to protect his new family. Sanfeng and Susu rescue Wuji then Susu kills herself to join Cuishan, leaving Wuji orphaned. Wuji is poisoned by the toxic chill of the Xuan Ming Divine Palm and collapses.

Miejue and her Emei disciples attack Yang Xiao, who kidnaps Xiaofu. Yang Xiao asks Xiaofu to take care of an orphan girl named Yan'er who has endured abuse for one month. After one month, Xiaofu wants to return to Emei; Yang Xiao tells her Miejue will consider that she and he have something between them and must be killed. Xiaofu tells Yang Xiao the Heavenly Reliant Sword means a lot to her master Miejue and she tricks Yang Xiao into promising never to see her again. Yang Xiao steals the Heavenly Reliant Sword from its Mongolian owner and returns it to Emei. Xiaofu leaves Emei and gives birth to a girl named Yang Buhui in honour of her love for Yang Xiao.

Wuji leaves a note to Sanfeng stating the god of mercy admires him and will cure him, and then he runs away. Wuji prepares to die but a girl named Zhou Zhiruo saves his life. Zhiruo's father looks for Yuchun. The next day, Zhiruo's father is ambushed, captured, and taken to a market where Wuji and Zhiruo were selling oranges. The soldiers force Zhirou's father to tell them the whereabouts of Chang Yuchun but he tells them he does not know. Sanfeng arrives but Zhiruo's father dies. Sanfeng returns to Wudang with Zhiruo to take care of her for Wuji while Yuchun takes Wuji to see Divine Physician Hu Qingniu at the Butterfly valley, who does not want to treat Wuji's cold poison. He feels Wuji's pulse and changes his mind. Wuji studies Qingniu's books and acquires some medical skills.

Sanfeng brings Zhiruo back to Wudang but recommends she would join the Emei sect as Miejue took her in as an Emei disciple.

Miejue finds Xiaofu in the Butterfly Valley and defeats Golden Flower Granny who is trying to take Wuji and Xiaofu to Divine Snake island. Later, Miejue kills Xiaofu in grief with her palm strike for choosing Yang Xiao over Emei and this is witnessed by Wuji and Buhui. Before Xiaofu died, she asked Wuji to send Buhui to her father Yang Xiao, and then returns to Wudang. On the way home, Wuji rescues a monkey from some dogs and is injured. The Zhu family tricks him to reveal Xie Xun's location. Wuji jumps off a cliff and Mr Zhu saves him but they are trapped on a small ledge. Wuji crawls through a narrow tunnel and finds the Nine Yang Divine manual from a white ape and masters it. The Nine Yang Divine Skill allows Wuji to cure his cold poison.

Mr Zhu kicks Wuji off the ledge. Wuji lands in a house and breaks both legs. Zhu'er helps him and attacks Jiuzhen with her spider poison as a result of killing the victim. Emei's disciples are guests at Jiuzhen's home. Emei disciples capture Zhu'er and Wuji.

Zhu'er and Wuji escape but Emei's disciples take them prisoners on their way to Bright Light Peak to exterminate Ming Cult. Wuji has an opportunity to privately speak to Zhiruo when looking for a herb.

Wuji receives three powerful punches from Miejue to save the lives and limbs of Ming Cult's Five-Colored Flags residents. Shuo Bude captures Wuji and takes him to the throne room. Wuji unintentionally masters the Ming Cult's most powerful martial art of Heaven and Earth Great Shift and saves the cult from extermination by the Great Six sects, nearly losing his life in the Bright Light Peak battle but not until revealing his true identity to his family who is the opposing sects by his deceased parents. The Great Six sects keep their word not to bother Ming Cult to Wuji and reluctantly becomes the cult's leader.

Wuji and Ming Cult set out to bring Xie Xun from the remote island. On the way, they come across Wuji's sixth uncle, Yin Liting, whose joints are broken by Shao Lin's people, who turned out to be Zhao Min's subordinates. The Ming Cult people go to Shao Lin but nobody is there. Wuji rushes to Wu Dang to save him from extermination and then uses Taiji Fist and Taiji Swordplay on the Mongolian princess Zhao Min's people.

Prior to the attack on Wudang, Zhao Min had already successfully captured and kept the Great Six sects in Wan An Si. A Ming Cult member and a spy within Zhao Min's people, Fan Yao, saves the sects. However, Miejue, still believing that the Ming Cult is evil and that Wuji has malicious intentions when saving the sects, refuses to accept Wuji's help and plunges to her death.

When Emei's disciples discuss whether Zhiruo or Minjun should be the next sect leader, Golden Flower Granny captures Zhiruo and takes her to Divine Snake Island. Zhao Min ensures she and Wuji are on the same ship as Golden Flower Granny. On Divine Snake Island, Wuji delays his reunion with Xie Xun. Persian Ming Cult attacks Golden Flower Granny. Xiao Zhao and her mother leave for Persia with the Persian Ming Cult people.

One morning, Wuji wakes to find Zhu'er dead and that Zhao Min, the Heavenly Sword, and the Dragon Saber are missing. Wuji, Xie Xun, and Zhiruo return to the mainland.

Mo Shenggu sees Qingshu's attempts to rape Zhiruo and tries to kill him. It results in his own death.

At Youliang's urging, Qingshu tries but fails to poison Sanfeng and is banished from Wu Dang.

Zhao Min lures Wuji away from his own wedding with Zhiruo.

All sects go to Shao Lin for an event. Zhiruo almost kills Wuji and emerges as the champion.

Zhao Min's father surrounds Shao Lin to exterminate the sects. Zhiruo gives the Book of Wumu to Wuji, who wins a few battles, but the tide turns after Zhao Min is killed by her father. Wuji mourns at Zhao Min's tombstone. Many people die, including Qingshu, Minjun, Yin Tianzheng, Xie Xun, many different cult disciples, and many soldiers. Shao Lin's siege ends when the Ming Cult army from Hao Zhou arrives.

It is revealed that Zhao Min is still alive. Her brother persuades her father to spare her and sends her back to Mongolia. But she returns for Zhang Wuji as she tells him she cannot live without him. Zhang Wuji and Zhao Min meet her father and brother for a peace treaty. The meeting goes well until Zhu Yuanzheng kills Zhao Min's father. Zhao Min leaves Zhang Wuji when he chooses his country over her but says he still cares for her and vows to go to Mongolia and find her.

The Ming Cult army has recovered most of China and Yuan emperor Toghon Temür flees to the Eurasian Steppe, where the Yuan remnants establish the Northern Yuan dynasty. Wuji, not wanting to be a sovereign for fear of being corrupted by power, chooses to remain in a righteous path and charges his followers to carry on protecting China against tyranny, injustice, and other threats. Off-screen, Zhu Yuanzhang, having earned a heroic reputation that rivals Wuji's from his battles against the Yuan forces, wins support from his subordinates and allies, and becomes the Ming dynasty's founder, the Hongwu Emperor.

In Mongolia, Wuji gets to be together with Zhao Min.

Cast
 Zeng Shunxi as Zhang Wuji
 Han Haolin as Zhang Wuji (child)
 Lu Zhanxiang  as Zhang Wuji (youth)
 Chen Yuqi as Zhao Min
 Zhu Xudan as Zhou Zhiruo
 Kabby Hui as Xiao Zhao
 Cao Xiyue as Yin Li / Zhu'er /
 Kathy Chow as Miejue Abbess
 Zhang Yonggang as Xie Xun
 Zhang Chaoren as  Song Qingshu
 Guo Jun as Song Yuanqiao
 Ethan Li as Zhang Cuishan
 Chen Xinyu as Yin Susu
 Lin Shen as Yang Xiao
 Wu Jingjing as Ji Xiaofu
 Sun Anke as Yang Buhui
 Wang Deshun as Zhang Sanfeng
 Zong Fengyan as Fan Yao 
 Louis Fan as Cheng Kun/Yuan Zhen /
 Xiao Rongsheng as Yin Tianzheng
 Yu Bo as Yang Dingtian
 Tao Luoyi as Ding Minjun
 Zhao Yingzi as Yellow Robed Maiden

Production
The drama was filmed from January 20 to June 14, 2018. Filming took place at Yandang Mountains.

Kathy Chow, who played Zhou Zhiruo in the 1994 adaptation of The Heaven Sword and Dragon Saber, plays Zhou Zhiruo's teacher, Miejue. Guo Jun, who played Zhang Songxi in the 2009 adaptation, plays Song Yuanqiao in the series.

International broadcast

Reception
The drama was criticized for its slow-motion action scenes. Among the cast, Lin Shen, and Zhu Xu Dan were notably praised for their acting.

Awards and nominations

Soundtracks
 Daojian Rumeng (刀劍如夢;  A life of fighting is but a dream) performed by Wakin Chau
 Liangliang Xiangwang (倆倆相忘; Forgetting Each Other) performed by Winnie Hsin
 Cǐshēng Wéini (此生惟你; This Life is only You) performed by Zhou Shen
 Cizhi Xin (赤子心; Pure Heart) performed by Li Qi
 Hewei Yongheng (何为永恒; What Is Eternity) performed by Hu Xia

References

2019 Chinese television series debuts
2019 Chinese television series endings
Chinese web series
Chinese wuxia television series
Sequel television series
Television series by Cathay Media
Television series set in the Yuan dynasty
Television shows about rebels
Television shows based on The Heaven Sword and Dragon Saber
Television series about orphans
Television shows set on islands
Tencent original programming